The 1906 Colorado Mines Orediggers football team was an American football team that represented the Colorado School of Mines as an independent during the 1906 college football season. The team compiled a 3–0–2 record, shut out four of its five opponents, and outscored all opponents by a total of 61 to 4.

Schedule

References

Colorado Mines
Colorado Mines Orediggers football seasons
College football undefeated seasons
Colorado Mines Orediggers football